Mesophleps sublutiana is a moth of the family Gelechiidae. It is found in Korea, China (Anhui, Guizhou, Hebei, Henan, Hong Kong, Hubei, Shaanxi, Shandong, Yunnan), Taiwan, Thailand, Malaysia (Brunei), Indonesia, Nepal, India and Sri Lanka.

The wingspan is 10–16 mm. The forewings are yellowish to ochreous brown, the distal three-fifths of the costa is black, interrupted by a faint oblique line running from four-fifths towards the termen.

The larvae feed on Cajanus cajan, Indigofera, Robinia pseudoacacia and Parkinsonia aculeata. They feed in the pods.

References

Moths described in 1990
Mesophleps